A by-election was held for the New South Wales Legislative Assembly seat of Port Macquarie on 18 October 2008. This was triggered by the resignation of independent MP Rob Oakeshott who was elected to the federal seat of Lyne at a by-election the previous month.

The writ for the Port Macquarie by-election was issued on 29 August, which was also when the rolls closed. Candidate nominations closed on 18 September. The by-election was contested on the same boundaries drawn for Port Macquarie at the 2007 state election. At that election, the independent MP won the seat over the Nationals by a two-party preferred margin of 78.2% to 21.8%.

Background
Created in a 1988 redistribution, Port Macquarie has always been based on Port Macquarie and Laurieton–Camden Haven. It was a safe National Party seat prior to the election of Oakeshott, who was MP for Port Macquarie since 1996, becoming an independent in 2002.

Candidates

The following candidates nominated for the election:
Independent - James Langley, contested federal Lyne for Labor in 2007. Quit the party over protest at the Iemma state Labor electricity privatisation.
Christian Democratic Party - Bob Waldron
Independent - Lisa Intemann (former Port Macquarie-Hastings councillor)
Greens - Susie Russell
National Party - Leslie Williams, Lake Cathie resident, contested Port Macquarie for the Nationals in 2007. Ms Williams is a nurse at Port Macquarie Base Hospital and current chairman of the party's Port Macquarie Electorate Council.
Independent - Tony Galati
Independent - Grant Rogers
Independent - Bob Sharpham
Independent - Peter Besseling
Independent - Jamie Harrison (former Port Macquarie-Hastings councillor)
Independent - Cameron Price

Campaign
Federal Hume MP Alby Schultz was seen campaigning a few times for Besseling, referring to him as "the pick of the candidates", with similar support from Senator Bill Heffernan, sparking anger and resentment within the coalition.

Results
Despite independent Rob Oakeshott moving into federal politics, another independent, Peter Besseling, retained the seat, winning on the primary and two party vote.

Rob Oakeshott resigned to successfully contest the federal seat of Lyne.

See also
Electoral results for the district of Port Macquarie
2011 New South Wales state election

References

2008 elections in Australia
New South Wales state by-elections
2000s in New South Wales